The President of the National Assembly of Quebec (French; Le Président de l'Assemblée nationale) is the presiding officer of the National Assembly of Quebec, Canada, which is modeled after the Westminster parliamentary system. In other Anglophone parliaments and legislatures the equivalent position is often called the "Speaker", which is why from 1867 to 1968, the presiding officer of the Assembly was known in French as "orateur," a translation of the English term "speaker".

Description
The President of the National Assembly is fifth in the Quebec order of precedence, after the King of Canada, the Lieutenant Governor of Quebec, the Premier, and the Deputy Premier. The National Assembly elects the president at the beginning of a legislature, for the length of the legislature. The president is assisted by the Vice Presidents of the Assembly, who serve in the absence of the president. Parti Québécois Member of the National Assembly (MNA) Louise Harel made history by being appointed as the first female President on March 12, 2002. The current President of the Assembly is the CAQ MNA Nathalie Roy. Roy is the second woman to serve in the role after Harel herself.

Roles
The function of the President holds three major roles.
Presiding over Assembly hearings.
Administration of Assembly services.
Representing the Assembly, notably in relations with other parliaments.

List of Presidents of the National Assembly of Quebec
 Joseph-Godric Blanchet - December 27, 1867 - Conservative
 Pierre Fortin - November 4, 1875 - Conservative
 Louis Beaubien - November 10, 1876 - Conservative
 Arthur Turcotte - June 4, 1878 - Conservative independent
 Louis-Olivier Taillon - March 8, 1882 - Conservative
 Jonathan Saxton Campbell Würtele - March 27, 1884 - Conservative
 Félix-Gabriel Marchand - January 27, 1887 - Liberal
 Pierre-Évariste Leblanc - April 26, 1892 - Conservative
 Jules Tessier - November 23, 1897 - Liberal
 Henri-Benjamin Rainville - February 14, 1901 - Liberal
 Auguste Tessier - March 2, 1905 - Liberal
 William Alexander Weir - April 25, 1905 - Liberal
 Philippe-Honoré Roy - January 15, 1907 - Liberal
 Jean-Marie-Joseph-Pantaléon Pelletier - March 2, 1909 - Liberal
 Cyrille-Fraser Delâge - January 9, 1912 - Liberal
 Antonin Galipeault - November 7, 1916 - Liberal
 Joseph-Napoléon Francoeur - December 10, 1919 - Liberal
 Hector Laferté - January 10, 1928 - Liberal
 Télesphore-Damien Bouchard - January 7, 1930 - Liberal
 Lucien Dugas - March 24, 1936 - Liberal
 Joseph-Mignault-Paul Sauvé - October 7, 1936 - Union Nationale
 Bernard Bissonnette - February 20, 1940 - Liberal
 Valmore Bienvenue - May 12, 1942 - Liberal
 Cyrille Dumaine - February 23, 1943 - Liberal
 Alexandre Taché - February 7, 1945 - Union Nationale
 Maurice Tellier - December 15, 1955 - Union Nationale
 Lucien Cliche - September 20, 1960 - Liberal
 John Richard Hyde - January 9, 1962 - Liberal
 Guy Lechasseur - October 22, 1965 - Liberal
 Rémi Paul - December 1, 1966 - Union Nationale
 Gérard Lebel - October 22, 1968 - Union Nationale
 Raynald Fréchette - February 24, 1970 - Union Nationale
 Jean-Noël Lavoie - June 9, 1970 - Liberal
 Clément Richard - December 14, 1976 - Parti Québécois
 Claude Vaillancourt - November 11, 1980 - Parti Québécois
 Richard Guay - March 23, 1983 - Parti Québécois
 Pierre Lorrain - December 16, 1985 - Liberal
 Jean-Pierre Saintonge - November 28, 1989 - Liberal
 Roger Bertrand - November 29, 1994 - Parti Québécois
 Jean-Pierre Charbonneau - March 12, 1996 - Parti Québécois
 Louise Harel - March 12, 2002 - Parti Québécois
 Michel Bissonnet - June 4, 2003 - Liberal
 François Gendron - October 21, 2008 - Parti Québécois
 Yvon Vallières - January 13, 2009 - Liberal
 Jacques Chagnon - April 5, 2011 - Liberal
 François Paradis - November 26, 2018 - Coalition Avenir Québec
 Nathalie Roy - November 29, 2022 - Coalition Avenir Quebec

All but one speaker was born in the province (Valmore Bienvenue was born in United States to Québécois parents). Henri-Benjamin Rainville died in the US and Cyrille Dumaine died in Ottawa.

External links
Page about the current President
National Assembly of Quebec

Politics of Quebec
Quebec
Speak